Premier Padmini is a 2019 Indian Kannada-language comedy drama film directed and written by Ramesh Indira. The film marks the debut of television personality, Shruti Naidu as the producer under her home banner Shruti Naidu Chitra.  The film features Jaggesh, Madhoo, Sudharani, Hitha Chandrashekar and Vivek Simha in the lead roles. The supporting cast includes H. G. Dattatreya, Bhargavi Narayan and Pramod.

The technical crew members for the film include Arjun Janya as the music composer, Advaita Gurumurthy as the cinematographer, Rajendra Urs as the editor.

The film launched in early March 2018 and released across theaters in Karnataka on 26 April 2019. The film was premiered on 29 September 2019 in Zee Kannada.

Plot

Cast 
 Jaggesh as Vinayak
 Madhoo as Shruti
 Sudharani as Spandana
 Pramod as Nanjundi
 Vivek Simha as Sumukha 
 Hitha Chandrashekar as Ranjani
 H. G. Dattatreya as Vinayak's neighbour
 Ramesh Indira as Rajesh
 Bhargavi Narayan
 Aishwarya Baspure as Pragati

Soundtrack

Arjun Janya has scored the soundtrack and score for the film. The album consists of four songs and according to Janya, as per the film's script he has composed Carnatic and Hindustani classical fusion songs apart from a traditional folk song and a romantic song.

References

External links 
  Premier Padmini (2019)

2019 films
2010s Kannada-language films
2019 comedy-drama films
Indian comedy-drama films
Films shot in Karnataka
Films scored by Arjun Janya